Dorothy Fay Hammerton (26 September 1893 – 23 June 1973), known professionally as Fay Holden, was a British-born, American-based actress. She was known as Gaby Fay early in her career.

Biography
Holden was born in Birmingham, England. After leaving England in 1929, Holden and her husband moved to Vancouver, British Columbia, Canada for a time. They co-owned The Empress Theatre until 1933, and they created a theatre company, The British Guild Players, that specialized in comedies during the depression era. Eventually they left Vancouver and moved to Hollywood.

Holden appeared in 46 motion pictures between 1935 and 1958, and she is best known for her recurring role as Emily Hardy, mother of Mickey Rooney's character in the Andy Hardy film series. The series was enormously popular in the late 1930s and early 1940s, and Holden was in 15 of the 16 Hardy movies, surpassed only by Rooney, who was in all 16.

Holden is remembered for her performance as Hazel, the mother of Samson (Victor Mature), in Cecil B. DeMille's Samson and Delilah, in which she utters her character's most notable line: "He wants to marry a Philistine!"

She was married to David Clyde from 1914 until his death in 1945. She died in Los Angeles, California, aged 79, from cancer.

Partial filmography

The Pace That Kills (1935) as Madame / Henchwoman
I Married a Doctor (1936) as Ella Stowbody
The White Angel (1936) as Queen Victoria (uncredited)
Wives Never Know (1936) as Mrs. Gossamer
Polo Joe (1936) as Aunt Minnie
The Accusing Finger (1936) as Little Old Lady (uncredited)
Guns of the Pecos (1937) as Aunt Carrie Burton
Bulldog Drummond Escapes (1937) as Natalie
Internes Can't Take Money (1937) as Mother Teresa
King of Gamblers (1937) as Nurse
Exclusive (1937) as Mrs. Swain
Souls at Sea (1937) as Mrs. Martin (uncredited)
Double or Nothing (1937) as Martha Sewell Clark
You're Only Young Once (1937) as Mrs. Emily Hardy
Love Is a Headache (1938) as Mary, Peter's Secretary
Judge Hardy's Children (1938) as Mrs. Emily Hardy
Test Pilot (1938) as Lingerie Saleslady (uncredited)
Hold That Kiss (1938) as Mrs. Evans
Love Finds Andy Hardy (1938) as Mrs. Emily Hardy
Out West with the Hardys (1938) as Mrs. Emily Hardy
Sweethearts (1938) as Hannah
Sergeant Madden (1939) as Mary Madden
The Hardys Ride High (1939) as Mrs. Emily Hardy
Andy Hardy Gets Spring Fever (1939) as Mrs. Emily Hardy
Judge Hardy and Son (1939) as Mrs. Emily Hardy
Andy Hardy Meets Debutante (1940) as Mrs. Emily Hardy
Bitter Sweet (1940) as Mrs. Millick
Andy Hardy's Private Secretary (1941) as Mrs. Emily Hardy
The Penalty (1941) (scenes deleted)
Washington Melodrama (1941) as Mrs. Claymore
Ziegfeld Girl (1941) as Mrs. Regan
I'll Wait for You (1941) as Mrs. Miller
Blossoms in the Dust (1941) as Mrs. Kahly
Life Begins for Andy Hardy (1941) as Mrs. Emily Hardy
H.M. Pulham, Esq. (1941) as Mrs. John Pulham
The Courtship of Andy Hardy (1942) as Mrs. Emily Hardy
Andy Hardy's Double Life (1942) as Mrs. Emily Hardy
Andy Hardy's Blonde Trouble (1944) as Mrs. Emily Hardy
Canyon Passage (1946) as Mrs. Overmire
Little Miss Big (1946) as Mary Jane Baxter
Love Laughs at Andy Hardy (1946) as Mrs. Emily Hardy
Whispering Smith (1948) as Emmy Dansing
Samson and Delilah (1949) as Hazelelponit
The Big Hangover (1950) as Martha Belney
Andy Hardy Comes Home (1958) as Mrs. Emily Hardy (final film role)

References

External links

 (as Gaby Fay)

1893 births
1973 deaths
American film actresses
English film actresses
Deaths from cancer in California
Deaths from multiple myeloma
Metro-Goldwyn-Mayer contract players
People from Birmingham, West Midlands
People from Greater Los Angeles
British emigrants to the United States
20th-century American actresses
Burials at Forest Lawn Memorial Park (Glendale)
20th-century British actresses
20th-century English women
20th-century English people